The following is a partial list of people significant to the Three Kingdoms period (220–280) of Chinese history. Their romanised names start with the letter A.

A

References

 Chen, Shou. Records of the Three Kingdoms (Sanguozhi).
 Pei, Songzhi. Annotations to Records of the Three Kingdoms (Sanguozhi zhu).

A